John H. McLaughlin (23 January 1944 – 15 July 2011) was a Scottish amateur football left half who made over 140 appearances in the Scottish League for Queen's Park.

References

Scottish footballers
Scottish Football League players
Queen's Park F.C. players
Association football wing halves
2011 deaths
Bonar Bridge F.C. players
Scotland amateur international footballers
1944 births
Sportspeople from Cambuslang
Footballers from South Lanarkshire